Honeyville may refer to:

Honeyville, Indiana
Honeyville, Utah
Honeyville, Virginia